The AMS Art Collection, or AMS Permanent Collection, is a Canadian art collection owned by the Alma Mater Society, a student organization of the University of British Columbia. The collection is one of only two university student-owned permanent art collections in Canada. It includes paintings by major Canadian artists, including E.J. Hughes, Lawren Harris, Iain Baxter&, Roy Arden, Takao Tanabe, Ann Kipling, Roy Kiyooka, Jack Shadbolt, Toni Onley, Elizabeth Wyn Wood, Lawrence Paul Yuxweluptun, Tom Borrows, and so forth. The collection was valued at around $4 million CAD in 2017.

History 
The collection's history begins in 1940, when a UBC professor in English Department, Hunter Lewis approached the AMS with an idea of creating student governed art collection. The collection was primarily meant to decorate the walls of the newly opened Brock Hall on campus. In 1948, E.J. Hughes' painting, Abandoned Village, Rivers Inlet, BC (1947) was purchased by the AMS as a first piece of Brock Art Collection, a predecessor of the AMS Art Collection.

Under B.C. Binning’s management since 1958, the collection has acquired 23 artworks by important Canadian artists, in order to establish the Brock Hall Art Collection as a Canadian landmark. After Binning's departure from the Brock Hall Art Committee in 1969 due to his retirement, however, the collection has stared to receive less care than it used to be under the quick change in leadership and slow selection process of the new committee. Despite the highly attempted acquisitions in post-Binning's era, exemplified by Alvin Balkind's suggestion to purchase a controversial piece, Bagged Landscape (1965–69) by Iain Baxter&, the overall collection was still dominated by the conservative ideology that the landscape and abstracted figurative paintings hallmark the history of Canadian Fine Art.

Especially since 1960, the collection has been under the constant risk of vandalization and theft. The collection was moved to the then-new Student Union Building [SUB] in 1970 to be only shown in the art gallery there. Despite this effort, in 1974, there was a supposed heist. The Ubyssey reported 8 to 18 missing or stolen works. Because of poor record-keeping, the Brock Hall Art committee was unable to identify which artworks had actually been stolen.

In 1982, this gallery space was turned into a lounge by following the suggestion made by the Student Administrative Committee. According to the gallery president in 1988, Sara Mair, the collection was deteriorating due to lack of interest. She reports six artworks newly missing possibly before new humidity controlled vault was built in the SUB to store this collection. At this point, there were 56 paintings in this collection. While the security and storage condition have eventually improved, the observed lack of interest prevailed for following decades. According to Vancouver Courier's report in 2007, the art gallery commissioner for the student society said that there was no permanent places to display this 67-piece collection. The society therefore was displaying several pieces from the collection whenever possible.

In 2015, the new student building, AMS Nest was completed, and collection has been moved to the vault in the basement of this building. The collection is occasionally on display at Hatch Art Gallery, a student organized gallery space inside the Nest.

History of selected collection pieces

Abandoned Village, Rivers Inlet, B.C. (1947) by E.J. Hughes 
This landscape painting joined the collection in 1948 as a first piece Block Hall Art Collection. The AMS paid 150 dollars for this oil painting "with the aid of fund donated by Lawren S. Harris and the graduating class of that year." This painting has become one of the most valuable works in the collection; in 2016, Hughes' another painting from 1949 was purchased for about 1.6 million dollars. This particular piece was valued at 900,000 dollars in the 2017 report. Although this piece is important in the history of AMS Art Collection, the AMS Council's Ad-Hoc Committee for the Sale of Hatch Art Planning and Execution (SHAPE) planned on selling this piece as a part of 2017 referendum, which allowed AMS the sale of up to 4 pieces from the collection.

Passiflora V (1963) by Roy Kiyooka 
This piece by Roy Kiyooka, an oil painting with some collage element on masonite was first exhibited at the Fifteenth Annual Contemporary Exhibition and Sale organized by the Women's Auxiliary to the Vancouver Art Gallery in 1963. The Block Hall Art Committee purchased this piece for five-hundred dollars from New Design Gallery, which was one of the first Canada's contemporary art galleries located at 1157 West Pender Street in Vancouver at the time. Passiflora V officially joined the collection in 1965, on the same year when Kiyooka became an associate member of the Royal Canadian Academy of Arts and represented Canada at the Eighth São Paulo Biennial in Brazil, where he won a silver medal.

Selected exhibition loans 

 1965 at Vancouver Art Gallery
 1974 at the SUB Art Gallery
 1988 The Alma Mater Society Art Collection at AMS Gallery
 2015-16 Yours, Mine, Ours: The AMS Permanent Collection at AHVA Gallery and Hatch Art Gallery
 2019 Contesting Paradise: BC Landscapes in the Permanent Collection at Hatch Art Gallery
 2020 "The Works of the AMS Art Collection (yes, all of them)" - cancelled due to COVID-19 pandemic

References

Canadian art collectors
University of British Columbia
G7 summits